Long Seniai (also known as Long Sinei) is a longhouse settlement in the Marudi division of Sarawak, Malaysia.

Neighbouring settlements include:

References

Populated places in Sarawak